Christmasville is an unincorporated community in Carroll County, Tennessee, United States.

Notable native
William Parker Caldwell, Tennessee politician, was born in Christmasville.

References

Unincorporated communities in Carroll County, Tennessee
Unincorporated communities in Tennessee